The Cayuga Lake AVA is an American Viticultural Area around Cayuga Lake in Upstate New York.  The boundaries of the AVA include portions of Cayuga, Seneca, and Tompkins counties.  Most of the vineyards in the AVA are planted in the shale soils of the hillsides on the western side of Cayuga Lake.  Vineyards are planted at a range of elevations above the surface of the lake, up to  higher.  The steep hillsides and the lake together form a unique micro-climate in autumn that helps extend the growing season by preventing cold air from settling and producing frost.  The Cayuga grape variety was created in this region by researchers at Cornell University.

History
The first winery in the area was founded in 1980, although grapes were grown on the shores of Cayuga Lake for the large wineries in Hammondsport before then. In 1981, four wineries on the lake banded together to form the Cayuga Lake Wine Trail, the first of its kind in New York State. By 1988, the appellation was given AVA status, the first Finger Lake to be granted its own AVA.

References

American Viticultural Areas
Geography of Cayuga County, New York
New York (state) wine
Geography of Seneca County, New York
Geography of Tompkins County, New York
1988 establishments in New York (state)